Carleton is a small village on the southern outskirts of Pontefract in West Yorkshire, England.  The village is home to the parish church of St Michael the Archangel, and two schools, Carleton High School and the Rookeries primary school.

Carleton was historically a township in the ancient parish of Pontefract in the West Riding of Yorkshire.  It became a separate civil parish in 1866.  In 1938 the civil parish was abolished and merged into Pontefract.

References 

Pontefract
Villages in West Yorkshire
Former civil parishes in West Yorkshire